Jarius is a masculine name, in use both as a given name and a family name. Notable people with the name include:

 Jarius Hayes (born 1973), American football tight end
 Jarius Holmes (born 1986), American soccer player
 Jarius Wright (born 1989), American football wide receiver
 Jarius Wynn (born 1986), American football defensive end

See also 
 Jairus (disambiguation), a similar name
 Jarrius Jackson (born 1985), American-Italian professional basketball player
 L'Jarius Sneed (born 1997), American football cornerback

Masculine given names